The Journal of Applied Psychology is a monthly, peer-reviewed academic journal published by the American Psychological Association. The journal emphasizes the publication of original investigations that contribute new knowledge and understanding to fields of applied psychology (other than clinical and applied experimental or human factors, which are more appropriate for other American Psychological Association journals). The journal primarily considers empirical and theoretical investigations that enhance understanding of cognitive, motivational, affective, and behavioral psychological phenomena." The editor-in-chief is Lillian Eby (University of Georgia).

The journal has implemented the Transparency and Openness Promotion (TOP) Guidelines.  The TOP Guidelines provide structure to research planning and reporting and aim to make research more transparent, accessible, and reproducible.

Abstracting and indexing
According to the Journal Citation Reports, the journal has a 2020 impact factor of 7.429.

Journal of Applied Psychology is indexed in:
PsycINFO
MEDLINE
SCOPUS

References

External links 
Journal of Applied Psychology.

American Psychological Association academic journals
Publications established in 1917
Applied psychology journals
Monthly journals